Protostrioconus is a synonym of Conus (Gastridium) Modeer, 1793 represented as Conus Linnaeus, 1758. These are sea snails, marine gastropod mollusks in the family Conidae, the cone snails and their allies.

Species
 Protostrioconus obscurus (G.B. Sowerby I, 1833) represented as Conus obscurus G.B. Sowerby I, 1833 (alternate representation)

References

 Tucker J.K. & Tenorio M.J. (2009) Systematic classification of Recent and fossil conoidean gastropods. Hackenheim: Conchbooks. 296 pp. page(s): 78
 Puillandre N., Duda T.F., Meyer C., Olivera B.M. & Bouchet P. (2015). One, four or 100 genera? A new classification of the cone snails. Journal of Molluscan Studies. 81: 1-23

External links
 To World Register of Marine Species

Conidae
Monotypic gastropod genera